Nderim Saraçi (born 1996) is a Kosovan chess International master since 2018 and a FIDE master since 2016. He is ranked as the best player in Kosovo. He belongs to the SK 1912 Ludwigshafen club.

He is 8 time Kosovan chess champion in 2013 to 2019 and 2021.

He won the open rapid Pristina chess tournament in 2019.

He drew 2nd- 4th place in the open rapid Adem Jashari chess tournament cup in 2019.

References

 Kosovan chess players
Chess International Masters
Living people
1996 births